Oy-Mittelberg is a municipality in the rural district Oberallgäu in Bavaria, Germany.

Geography

Oy-Mittelberg is situated in the Allgäu region in the foothills of the Allgäu Alps. The municipality consists of the villages of Burgkranzegg, Faistenoy, Haslach, Kressen, Maria-Rain, Mittelberg, Oberschwarzenberg, Oberzollhaus, Oy, Petersthal and Riedis. In addition to that there are several small hamlets.

References

Oberallgäu